Orell Füssli is a Swiss banknotes printing and bookselling company, established by Christoph Froschauer in 1519 as a book printer and publisher. It is currently operating in many print-related segments, such as security printing, bookselling and publishing, with security printing being a primary contemporary product of company. Company's shares are traded on SIX Swiss Exchange since 1897. It is the oldest continuously publicly traded company of Switzerland.

History

From Froschauer Druckerei (1519) to "Orell, Gessner, Füssli & Cie." (1770)

At the beginning of the 16th century, the Imperial free city of Zurich became increasingly important as a location holding the Federal Diet of Switzerland. After the position of the Leutpriestertum (people's priest) of the Grossmünster at Zurich became vacant in late 1518, the canons of the foundation in charge of the Grossmünster elected Ulrich Zwingli to become the stipendiary priest and on 27 December 1519 he moved permanently to Zurich from where he subsequently initiated the Swiss Reformation. 
Around the same time, a book printer Christoph Froschauer relocates from Altötting in Bavaria to Zurich to be granted the rights of citizen of Zurich in 1519. The city commissioned him with the task of setting up a printing press along with further assignments that would result in the establishment and expansion of the printers. Froschauersche Druckerei received the status of a state printer and ultimately published the works of Erasmus von Rotterdam, Martin Luther and Zwingli. Subsequently, Froschauer Druckerei expanded its product range to include historical, medical and scientific writings.

From 1530 to 1585, the Druckerei emerged as one of the most prominent publishers in the German-speaking field and in the years to follow, the business would change owners within the Zurich wealthy elite. Among the families involved were Escher, Wolf, Bodmer, Heidegger and Rahn with the Druckerei also changing its name after being acquired by one family from another.
 
In consequence of the progress of Counter-Reformation in Germany, the Druckerei was to scale down its product range to offer mainly theological writings and Sittenmandate. It is not until 1744, as the Zurich Ratsherr Johann Rudolf Füssli joined the company as a partner and shifted the focus to the areas of theology, natural sciences, history and arts. In 1766, he becomes the sole owner of the business which from then on is referred to as "Füssli & Cie.".

Hans Conrad von Orelli and his uncle Johann Jakob Bodmer run "Orell & Cie.", a publishing house with a Druckerei. The Gessner family who also operated a Druckerei since 1670 and later a bookshop joined "Orell & Cie." in 1761. Consequently, the business was renamed to "Orell, Gessner & Cie."

In 1770, both businesses - "Füssli & Cie." and "Orell, Gessner & Cie." - merged to become "Orell, Gessner, Füssli & Cie."

In 1780 the company expanded its product range by entering into the newspaper business with the publication of the "Zürcher Zeitung" that was to become "Neue Zürcher Zeitung" in 1821.
Almost 90 years upon expansion, the newspaper business was spun off in form of a separate Aktiengesellschaft in 1868.

At the end of the 18th century, it was notable for its bookshop in Zurich. It specialized in disseminating literature of the French Enlightenment by means of written orders through the publishing house Société typographique de Neuchâtel (STN), which was known to print banned books.

From 1793 to 1794, Orell Füssli published Marianne Ehrmann's Die Einsiedlerinn aus den Alpen, the first magazine  published by a woman in Switzerland.

19th century
Upon the end of Napoleonic Wars, the appeal of Zurich as a publishing location sharply diminished.
As the competitive pressure increases on the market in Germany, the publishing program moves back to Switzerland related topics and the focus of the business shifts to printing.

The evidence for the first printing of securities dates back to 1827 and the first share certificates for Escher Wyss are printed in 1839.
In line with the developments of industrialisation in Switzerland, Orell Füssli becomes one of the first printers to introduce high-speed newsprint press and would use it in production of NZZ which from 1843 on is published daily.

On March 1, 1843, the Canton of Zurich released the Zurich 4 and 6 printed by Orell Füssli, the first postage stamps in Switzerland, and the second series worldwide, following the Penny Black issued in the UK in 1840.
Upon the adoption of the Swiss Federal Constitution in 1848, the prerogative for operating postal services passes to the federal government in 1849 and the company did not further pursue this line of business.

The second half of the century provides Orell Füssli with enormous growth opportunities.

Switzerland's first advertisement office ("Annoncenbüro") is established which would subsequently turn into ofa Orell Füssli Werbe AG.
Railway advertising starts at a large scale requiring posters of all kinds alongside the emergence of tourist information offices who are looking for  
mass-printed travel brochures and timetables. Orell Füssli is able to accommodate for these demands. 
Upon introduction of the 10-colour Photochrom process for colour reproductions in 1880, Orell Füssli further expanded its range of product offerings to include reproductions of all kinds and, in particular, series of maps of foreign territories. In quick succession, the company opens numerous branches on the European continent and in the USA.

On 15 February 1870, the "bank of the citizens of Zurich", Zürcher Kantonalbank founded by the Canton of Zurich, opened its first bank counter.  
The mandate to print banknotes is assigned to Orell Füssli and the company begins to specialise in this field.

A descendant company, Orell Füssli Filialen, still exists.

Acquisition history

The following is an illustration of the company's historical predecessors:

Products and services 
Orell Füssli has printed some of Switzerland's banknotes for the Swiss National Bank since 1911.

Recently, it printed the Series C of the Israeli new shekel.

Group structure 
After the Group's reorganization into a holding structure in 1999, the following companies are wholly owned subsidiaries of the Group:
  Orell Füssli Security Printing Ltd;
  OF IP Sicherheitsdruck Ltd;
  OF IP Verlag Ltd; and
  Orell Füssli Dienstleistungs Ltd.

In 2013, as a result of the merger between the book retailing activities of Thalia Bücher Ltd and Orell Füssli Buchhandlungs Ltd, a new company, Orell Füssli Thalia Ltd was created with each parent company holding a 50% interest. The Orell Füssli Holding AG holds 51% of the capital of 
  Orell Füssli Buchhandlungs Ltd,

while the Hugendubel Holding Ltd holds the remaining 49%.

The Zeiser Group is another wholly owned subsidiary of the Orell Füssli Holding AG. The parent company of the Zeiser Group is
 Zeiser GmbH
with registered address in Emmingen, Germany and incorporated pursuant to German laws. Zeiser Group's wholly owned subsidiaries include Zeiser Inc.(domiciled in West Caldwell, US), Zeiser Ltd. (Andover, GB), and Zeiser SRL (Milano, Italy).

The Orell Füssli Holding AG also holds a 24% interest in
 Orell Füssli Kartographie Ltd.

Company's auditor is PwC in Zürich.

Corporate governance

Board of directors

Group executive board

Shareholders
The share capital of the Orell Füssli Holding AG consists of 1'960'000 registered shares with a par value of CHF 1.00 each with shareholdings allocated as follows:

References and notes

Notes

References

External links
 
Orell Füssli Security Printing

Culture of Zürich
Companies based in Zürich
Economic history of Switzerland
Swiss brands
Security printing
Banknote printing companies
Retail companies of Switzerland
Book publishing companies of Switzerland
Multinational companies headquartered in Switzerland
Companies listed on the SIX Swiss Exchange